Daniel Ryan Cormier (born March 20, 1979) is an American former professional mixed martial artist, amateur wrestler, and current commentator for the UFC. He is a former Ultimate Fighting Championship (UFC) Light Heavyweight and Heavyweight Champion. Cormier is the second fighter in UFC history to hold titles in two weight classes simultaneously and is the first fighter to have title defenses in two divisions. As an international wrestler, Cormier was a six-time US World or Olympic Team Member, a World bronze medalist, a World Cup runner-up, a Pan American Games gold medalist (bronze in 2007) and a two-time Pan American champion. In folkstyle wrestling, Cormier was an NCAA Division I national finalist (with loss to the eventual four-time NCAA champion Cael Sanderson from Iowa State) and two-time Big 12 Conference runner-up for the Oklahoma State Cowboys. He was also a two-time NJCAA champion.

Prior to competing in the UFC, Cormier was the Strikeforce Heavyweight Grand Prix Champion and King of the Cage Heavyweight Champion.

Background and wrestling career
Cormier was born and raised in Lafayette, Louisiana.  Cormier is the son of Joseph and Audrey Cormier. He has an older brother named Joseph, a sister named Felicia, and a younger brother named Ferral. When Cormier was seven, his father was shot and killed on Thanksgiving Day in 1986 by the father of his second wife.

In high school at Northside High, Cormier won 3 Louisiana state championships in wrestling. After 9th grade, Cormier only lost twice, both times by injury default. His final high school record was 101–9, with 89 of his victories coming by a fall. He was twice voted the most outstanding wrestler of the state tournament. In 1995, Cormier won a bronze medal in the world championships in Greco-Roman Wrestling cadet (15–16 years old) division. He was also an all-state football player at high school in the linebacker position and had a personal best time of 4.5 seconds in the 40-yard dash. Cormier was offered a scholarship to play football at LSU, but declined in order to continue to pursue wrestling.

After high school, he attended Colby Community College in Kansas, where he was a two-time junior college national champion at 197 pounds, in 1998 and 1999. His record was 61–0, with 33 falls. After Colby, Cormier transferred to Division I Oklahoma State University. In 2000, Cormier went 26–5. He entered the national tournament as the #3 seed at 184 pounds but fell one match short of becoming an all-American (given to the top 8 finishers in each weight class). In 2001, Cormier went 27–5. He became an all-American by reaching the finals of the 184-pound weight class, in which he lost to Cael Sanderson 8–4. His final record was 53–10, with 27 falls. 6 of Cormier's losses were to Cael Sanderson.

After graduating from OSU with a degree in sociology, Cormier went on to have a successful career in Freestyle Wrestling. He was the senior U.S. national champion every year from 2003–2008 and represented team USA at the world level for each of those years. He competed at 96 kg, or 211.6 lbs. At the 2004 Olympics, he came 4th after losing to Khadzhimurat Gatsalov in the semifinals. Cormier was also a member of the 2008 Olympic wrestling team for the USA, where he was named team captain but was pulled from competition due to kidney failure, brought on by excessive weight cutting.

In the non-Olympic years, Cormier reached the top 5 at the Wrestling World Championships in 2003 and 2007. He won a bronze medal at the 2007 competition. Cormier also won a gold medal at the quadrennial Pan American Games in 2003. Another major accomplishment came in 2005, when Cormier became one of a select few Americans to win a gold medal at the Golden Grand-Prix Ivan Yarygin, held in Krasnoyarsk, Russia, and considered by many to be the most challenging wrestling tournament in the world.

Cormier also competed and represented the Oklahoma Slam team in the now-defunct Real Pro Wrestling league. He was crowned a champion in its first and only season in 2004, for the 211 lb weight class. While he competed in Real Pro Wrestling, he was teammates with fellow Strikeforce mixed martial arts competitor Muhammed Lawal, who also was a season 1 champion, in the 184 lb weight class.

Cormier is the head wrestling coach at Gilroy High School, having been appointed in the summer of 2018. In April 21, 2021, Cormier was inducted into the LHSAA Hall of Fame due to his sporting accomplishments.

Mixed martial arts career

Xtreme MMA
After the 2008 Olympics, Cormier decided to pursue a career in mixed martial arts. He trained with Cain Velasquez, Jon Fitch, and Josh Koscheck at American Kickboxing Academy. It helped him improve as a striker and submission wrestler.

After making his professional debut in September 2009, Cormier traveled to Australia and fought for Xtreme MMA. He defeated Lucas Browne to win the XMMA Heavyweight Championship on July 31, 2010. Two weeks later, Cormier won his second MMA title by winning the KOTC Heavyweight Championship from Tony Johnson.

Strikeforce
Cormier signed an eight-fight deal with the Strikeforce organization and debuted at Strikeforce Challengers: Kennedy vs. Cummings, defeating Gary Frazier by TKO.

Cormier fought at the event Strikeforce Challengers: Johnson vs. Mahe on March 26, 2010, in Fresno, California, where he defeated John Devine by KO.

Shortly thereafter, Cormier fought Strikeforce: Houston event on August 21, 2010, defeating Jason Riley via submission (punches) at 1:02 into the fight.

Cormier next fought Devin Cole at the Strikeforce Challengers: Woodley vs. Saffiedine event on January 7, 2011, in Nashville, Tennessee. He won via unanimous decision, the first time a fight of his had gone the distance.

Cormier was scheduled to face Shane del Rosario at Strikeforce: Overeem vs. Werdum on June 18, 2011, in Dallas, Texas, but his opponent was involved in a car accident and withdrew from the bout. Cormier instead faced Jeff Monson and won via decision. Cormier used his striking to dominate Monson on the feet and did not allow for any takedowns, negating Monson's submission ability.

Despite Cormier's reservations about competing in the Strikeforce Heavyweight Grand Prix due to inexperience, height and reach disadvantage over the rest of the field, he nonetheless entered, and faced Antônio Silva on only five weeks' notice on September 10, 2011, at Strikeforce: Barnett vs. Kharitonov, replacing Alistair Overeem. In a shocking upset, he won the fight via KO (punches) in the first round, catching Silva with multiple hits to the jaw, causing him to collapse, and then finishing with two hammer blows to the face of the grounded Silva before the referee could stop the fight. Cormier later revealed that he had broken his hand during the fight.

He faced fellow finalist Josh Barnett on May 19, 2012, at Strikeforce: Barnett vs. Cormier. Cormier won the five-round fight by unanimous decision (49–46, 50–45, and 50–45) and became the Strikeforce Heavyweight Grand Prix Champion. It was discovered that Cormier, once again, had broken his right hand during his bout with Barnett, and he underwent hand surgery.

Cormier was scheduled to fight former UFC Heavyweight Champion Frank Mir on November 3, 2012, at Strikeforce: Cormier vs. Mir. However, on September 19 it was revealed that Mir had been forced to pull out of the bout due to an injury.

Cormier fought Dion Staring at Strikeforce: Marquardt vs. Saffiedine on January 12, 2013. He won via TKO in the second round.

Ultimate Fighting Championship

Early fights
Cormier made his promotional debut against Frank Mir on April 20, 2013, at UFC on Fox 7. He won the fight via unanimous decision. Due to Cain Velasquez, Cormier's teammate, being the UFC heavyweight champion, Cormier considered moving down to the UFC's light heavyweight division. Some writers expressed doubt in his ability to cut down to the 205 limit safely, citing the fact that Cormier had suffered kidney failure during his time as an Olympic wrestler when trying to make 211 lbs. After failing to compete at the Olympics, he gained 40 lbs.

In his second UFC fight, Cormier faced Roy Nelson on October 19, 2013, at UFC 166. He won the fight via unanimous decision. Prior to the bout, he announced that, win or lose, he would be moving down to the light heavyweight division. Cormier weighed in for the bout more than 20 pounds lighter than previous contests, at 224 pounds.

Cormier was expected to face Rashad Evans at UFC 170 on February 22, 2014, in his first fight at light heavyweight. However, a leg injury knocked Evans off the card ten days before the event, and he was replaced by newcomer Patrick Cummins. Cormier won the fight via TKO in the first round.

Cormier was briefly linked to a bout with Rafael Cavalcante on July 5, 2014, at UFC 175. However, it was announced that Cormier would instead be fighting Dan Henderson on May 24, 2014, at UFC 173. After dominating the fight with his wrestling and top game, Cormier choked Henderson to sleep to win via technical submission in the third round.

Daniel Cormier was chosen as spokesperson for his new Cage Fighter signature wrestling shoe when he competed in an exhibition wrestling match against Chris Pendleton during the UFC Fan Expo.

Cormier vs. Jones
Cormier was expected to face UFC light heavyweight champion Jon Jones at UFC 178 on September 27, 2014, after Alexander Gustafsson was forced to withdraw due to a torn meniscus. However, on August 12, Jones, citing an injury, was forced to pull out of the bout. The fight eventually took place at UFC 182. At UFC 182 Cormier was defeated by Jon Jones via unanimous decision. Both fighters were awarded a Fight of the Night bonus.

Light heavyweight champion
Cormier was expected to face Ryan Bader on June 6, 2015, at UFC Fight Night 68. However, on April 28, 2015, it was announced that Jon Jones had been stripped of the light heavyweight championship and suspended indefinitely after facing felony charges stemming from a traffic accident in Albuquerque, New Mexico. Subsequently, Cormier was pulled from the Bader fight and replaced Jones against Anthony Johnson on May 23, 2015, at UFC 187 for the vacant title. In the opening seconds of the fight, Cormier was dropped by an overhand right by Johnson. Cormier won the next two rounds and submitted Johnson by rear-naked choke in the third round to become the new UFC light heavyweight champion. The last time the championship had changed hands was in 2011. The fight earned Cormier a Performance of the Night bonus.

Cormier faced Alexander Gustafsson on October 3, 2015, at UFC 192. Cormier won the back-and-forth fight via split decision (47–48, 48–47, and 49–46). Their performance earned both participants Fight of the Night honors.

In November 2015, Cormier stated that he had signed a new, eight-fight contract with the UFC.

A rematch with Jon Jones was expected to take place on April 23, 2016, at UFC 197. However, Cormier pulled out of the fight on April 1 citing a foot injury and was replaced by Ovince Saint Preux. The rematch with Jones was rescheduled for July 9, 2016, at UFC 200. On July 6, it was announced that the fight between Jones and Cormier was off due to a potential doping violation from Jon Jones. Cormier fought former UFC Middleweight Champion Anderson Silva in a 3-round non-title fight at the event. Cormier won the fight via unanimous decision.

A rematch with Anthony Johnson was expected to take place on December 10, 2016, at UFC 206. However, on November 25, 2016, Cormier withdrew from the bout due to injury. The pairing was rescheduled again for April 8, 2017, at UFC 210. At the weigh-in for the fight, Cormier was 1.2 pounds over the 205 pound limit for a light heavyweight championship fight: he was allowed a second weigh-in and came in at the 205 limit. Cormier won the fight via rear-naked choke submission in the second round.

Jon Jones rematch and controversy
The rematch with Jon Jones took place on July 29, 2017, at UFC 214 at the Honda Center in Anaheim, California. Jones defeated Cormier, recapturing the light heavyweight championship via knockout in the third round, after a head kick and a barrage of strikes on the ground.

In the post-fight interview, a tearful and emotional Cormier showed disappointment of the defeat and said "I guess if he wins both fights there is no rivalry." Commentator Joe Rogan issued an apology on Twitter to Cormier after the fight for interviewing him when Cormier could not gather his thoughts due to the knock out he suffered in the fight.

On August 22, it was announced that Jones had been flagged for a potential doping violation by USADA stemming from his test sample that was collected after weigh-ins on July 28. He tested positive for Oral Turinabol, an anabolic steroid. Jones was placed on a provisional suspension as a result of the positive drug test. On September 13, USADA confirmed that the "B" sample of Jones' tested positive for Turinabol. As a result, the CSAC officially changed the bout result to a no-contest and the light heavyweight championship was returned to Cormier. On September 18, Cormier, in an interview with TMZ, said he was open to a third fight with Jon Jones after Jones's suspension was served.

In 2018 Cormier coached opposite Stipe Miocic on season 27 of The Ultimate Fighter.

Resumed title reign
Cormier faced Volkan Oezdemir on January 20, 2018, at UFC 220. He defeated Oezdemir via TKO in the second round. This win earned him the Performance of the Night bonus.

Heavyweight champion and retirement
Cormier faced Stipe Miocic for the UFC heavyweight championship on July 7, 2018, at UFC 226. He won the fight via knockout in the first round, becoming the second fighter to hold two titles simultaneously in the UFC. As of August 17, 2019, Cormier is one of four fighters to have held two UFC championships simultaneously. This fight earned him the  Performance of the Night award. Provoked by Cormier after his victory, Brock Lesnar emerged from the audience and came into the octagon to accept the challenge by the new champion.

On October 9, the UFC announced that Cormier would be making the first defense of his heavyweight championship against Derrick Lewis at UFC 230; he defeated Lewis via rear-naked choke in the second round, becoming the first man to submit Lewis in MMA. This made Cormier the first UFC fighter to win and defend both the Light Heavyweight and Heavyweight belts, and the first UFC fighter successfully to defend both belts. Cormier relinquished the light heavyweight title a day before UFC 232, with his focus solely on defending the heavyweight title, stating: "I'd rather walk away this way, than have the history books say I was stripped".

Since the potential matchup with Brock Lesnar never materialised, with Lesnar instead opting to re-sign with the WWE, Cormier decided to fight Miocic again. The rematch took place on August 17, 2019, at UFC 241, just over a year since their first fight. Despite his early success, Cormier lost the fight by TKO in the fourth round, ending his reign as heavyweight champion.

The trilogy bout between Cormier and Miocic took place on August 15, 2020, at UFC 252 . Cormier lost the fight by unanimous decision and announced his retirement from the sport.

Championships and accomplishments

Mixed martial arts
 Ultimate Fighting Championship
 UFC Hall of Fame
 UFC Heavyweight Championship (One time)
 One successful title defense
 UFC Light Heavyweight Championship (One time)
 Three successful title defenses
 Fight of the Night (Two times) vs. Jon Jones and Alexander Gustafsson
 Performance of the Night (Three times) vs. Anthony Johnson, Volkan Oezdemir and Stipe Miocic
 First fighter successfully to defend titles in two weight classes
 Fifth multi-divisional champion in UFC history
 Second simultaneous multi-divisional champion
 Strikeforce
 Strikeforce Heavyweight Grand Prix Champion
 King of the Cage
 KOTC Heavyweight Championship (One time)
 Xtreme MMA
 XMMA Heavyweight Championship (One time)
One successful title defense
 ESPN
 Upset of the Month (2011) vs. Antônio Silva on September 10
 Fighter of the Year (2018)
 CombatPress.com
 2018 Male Fighter of the Year
 MMAJunkie.com
 2015 January Fight of the Month vs. Jon Jones
 2015 October Fight of the Month vs. Alexander Gustafsson
 2018 Male Fighter of the Year
MMA Fighting
 2018 Fighter of the Year
 Sherdog
 2014 Beatdown of the Year vs. Dan Henderson at UFC 173
 2014 All-Violence 3rd Team
MMADNA.nl
2018 Male Fighter of the Year.
 Wrestling Observer Newsletter
 Feud of the Year (2014) vs. Jon Jones
 Most Outstanding Fighter of the Year (2018)
World MMA Awards
2018 Charles 'Mask' Lewis Fighter of the Year
2018 Analyst of the Year
2019 – July 2020 Analyst of the Year
ESPY Award
2018 Best MMA Fighter

Freestyle wrestling
 United World Wrestling (FILA)
2007 Wrestling World Championships Bronze Medalist
 2007 Pan American Games Bronze Medalist
 2007 Dave Schultz Memorial International Open Gold Medalist
 2005 Super Cup Silver Medalist
 2005 Wrestling World Cup Silver Medalist
 2005 Ivan Yarygin Memorial Tournament Senior Gold Medalist
 2004 Boutiatyr Grand Prix Gold Medalist
 2003 FILA Absolute Championship Bronze Medalist
 2003 Ivan Yarygin Cup Bronze Medalist
 2003 Pan American Games Gold Medalist
 2002 Medved International Championships Gold Medalist
 2002 Sunkist Kids/ASU International Open Gold Medalist
 2002 Pan American Championships Gold Medalist
 2002 Dave Schultz Memorial International Open Bronze Medalist
 2001 Sunkist Kids International Open Gold Medalist
 2001 Dave Schultz Memorial International Open Gold Medalist
 USA Wrestling
 USA Senior National Championship (2003, 2004, 2005, 2006, 2007, 2008)
 US Senior World Team Trials Winner (2005, 2006, 2007)
 Northwest Senior Regional Championship (2008)
 John Smith Freestyle Wrestler of the Year Award (2007)
  George Tragos/Lou Thesz Professional Wrestling Hall of Fame
George Tragos Award (2019)

Greco-Roman wrestling
 United World Wrestling (FILA)
1995 Cadet World Championships Bronze Medalist

Folkstyle wrestling
 National Collegiate Athletic Association
NCAA Division I 184 lb National Runner-up out of Oklahoma State University (2001)
NCAA Division I All-American out of Oklahoma State University  (2001)
 Big 12 Conference
 Big 12 184 lb National Runner-up out of Oklahoma State University (2000, 2001)
 National Junior College Athletic Association
 NJCAA Wrestling Hall of Fame Inductee (2009)
 NJCAA Collegiate National Championship (1998, 1999)
 NJCAA All-American (1998, 1999)
 National High School Coaches Association
 NHSCA Senior All-American (1997)
 Louisiana High School Athletic Association
 LHSAA Hall of Fame inductee
LHSAA Division I High School State Championship (1995, 1996, 1997)
 LHSAA Division I All-State (1995, 1996, 1997)
 ASICS Tiger High School All-American (1996, 1997)

Personal life

Cormier and a former girlfriend had one daughter who died in a car accident on June 14, 2003. He was also previously married to a woman named Robin.

On February 16, 2011, he and his then-fiancée Salina Deleon  had a son, Daniel Jr. Daniel Jr. trains in amateur wrestling at AKA, where Cormier is the assistant coach. On March 4, 2012, Cormier and his fiancée had a daughter. In June 2017, Cormier and Deleon were married.

Cormier is a dedicated fan of the New Orleans Saints and professional wrestling.

On October 1, 2016, Cormier made his first appearance in the UFC color commentary team at UFC Fight Night 96 in Portland, Oregon. He has been part of the regular UFC commentary team since his sport retirement in August 2020.

On March 5, 2022, Cormier was absent from the commentary team for UFC 272 as he attended the funeral of his mother.

As part of his UFC duties on ESPN, he has co-hosted the podcasts DC & Helwani (with Ariel Helwani) and currently DC & RC (with Ryan Clark).

Media appearances
Cormier made his film debut in 2014, playing himself in the 2014 comedy Mantervention.

In February 2015, Cormier starred in the video clip All About That Cake, a parody of All About That Bass, to promote the 2015 World MMA Awards.

In January 2018, he was featured on an episode of Sneaker Shopping on the YouTube channel Complex.

In February 2019 he featured in "Sub-Zero's Head Shatter", the first episode of the YouTube series "The Science of Mortal Kombat" by Because Science.

On October 8, 2022, Cormier refereed the bout between Seth Rollins and Matt Riddle at WWE Extreme Rules 2022.

Mixed martial arts record

|-
|Loss
|align=center|22–3 (1)
|Stipe Miocic
|Decision (unanimous)
|UFC 252
|
|align=center|5
|align=center|5:00
|Las Vegas, Nevada, United States
|
|-
|Loss
|align=center|22–2 (1)
|style="text-align:left;"| Stipe Miocic
|TKO (punches)
|UFC 241
|
|align=center|4
|align=center|4:09
|Anaheim, California, United States
|
|-
|Win
|align=center|22–1 (1)
|style="text-align:left;"| Derrick Lewis
|Submission (rear-naked choke)
|UFC 230
|
|align=center|2
|align=center|2:14
|New York City, New York, United States
|
|-
|Win
|align=center|21–1 (1)
|style="text-align:left;"|Stipe Miocic
|KO (punches)
|UFC 226
|
|align=center|1
|align=center|4:33
|Las Vegas, Nevada, United States
|
|-
|Win
|align=center|20–1 (1)
|style="text-align:left;"| Volkan Oezdemir
|TKO (punches)
|UFC 220
|
|align=center|2
|align=center|2:00
|Boston, Massachusetts, United States
| 
|-
|NC
|align=center|
|style="text-align:left;"|Jon Jones
|NC (overturned by CSAC)
|UFC 214
|
|align=center|3
|align=center|3:01
|Anaheim, California, United States
|
|-
|Win
|align=center|19–1
|style="text-align:left;"|Anthony Johnson
|Submission (rear-naked choke)
|UFC 210
|
|align=center|2
|align=center|3:37
|Buffalo, New York, United States
| 
|-
|Win
|align=center|18–1
|style="text-align:left;"| Anderson Silva
|Decision (unanimous)
|UFC 200
|
|align=center|3
|align=center|5:00
|Las Vegas, Nevada, United States
| 
|-
| Win
| align=center | 17–1
|style="text-align:left;"| Alexander Gustafsson
| Decision (split)
| UFC 192
| 
| align=center | 5
| align=center | 5:00
| Houston, Texas, United States
| 
|-
| Win
| align=center | 16–1
|style="text-align:left;"| Anthony Johnson
| Submission (rear-naked choke)
| UFC 187
| 
| align=center | 3
| align=center | 2:39
| Las Vegas, Nevada, United States
| 
|-
| Loss
| align=center | 15–1
|style="text-align:left;"| Jon Jones
| Decision (unanimous)
| UFC 182
| 
| align=center | 5
| align=center | 5:00
| Las Vegas, Nevada, United States
| 
|-
| Win
| align=center | 15–0
|style="text-align:left;"| Dan Henderson
| Technical Submission (rear-naked choke)
| UFC 173
| 
| align=center | 3
| align=center | 3:53
| Las Vegas, Nevada, United States
|
|-
| Win
| align=center | 14–0
|style="text-align:left;"|Patrick Cummins
| TKO (punches)
| UFC 170
| 
| align=center | 1
| align=center | 1:19
| Las Vegas, Nevada, United States
| 
|-
| Win
| align=center | 13–0
|style="text-align:left;"|Roy Nelson
| Decision (unanimous)
| UFC 166
| 
| align=center | 3
| align=center | 5:00
| Houston, Texas, United States
|
|-
| Win
| align=center | 12–0
|style="text-align:left;"| Frank Mir
| Decision (unanimous)
| UFC on Fox: Henderson vs. Melendez
| 
| align=center | 3
| align=center | 5:00
| San Jose, California, United States
|
|-
| Win
| align=center | 11–0
|style="text-align:left;"| Dion Staring
| TKO (punches)
| Strikeforce: Marquardt vs. Saffiedine
| 
| align=center | 2
| align=center | 4:02
| Oklahoma City, Oklahoma, United States
|
|-
| Win
| align=center | 10–0
|style="text-align:left;"|Josh Barnett
| Decision (unanimous)
| Strikeforce: Barnett vs. Cormier
| 
| align=center | 5
| align=center | 5:00
| San Jose, California, United States
| 
|-
| Win
| align=center | 9–0
|style="text-align:left;"|Antônio Silva
| KO (punches)
| Strikeforce: Barnett vs. Kharitonov
| 
| align=center | 1
| align=center | 3:56
| Cincinnati, Ohio, United States
| 
|-
| Win
| align=center | 8–0
|style="text-align:left;"|Jeff Monson
| Decision (unanimous)
| Strikeforce: Overeem vs. Werdum
| 
| align=center | 3
| align=center | 5:00
| Dallas, Texas, United States
| 
|-
| Win
| align=center | 7–0
|style="text-align:left;"|Devin Cole
| Decision (unanimous)
| Strikeforce Challengers: Woodley vs. Saffiedine
| 
| align=center | 3
| align=center | 5:00
| Nashville, Tennessee, United States
|
|-
| Win
| align=center | 6–0
|style="text-align:left;"| Soa Palelei
| TKO (submission to punches)
| XMMA 3
| 
| align=center | 1
| align=center | 2:23
| Sydney, Australia
| 
|-
| Win
| align=center | 5–0
|style="text-align:left;"|Jason Riley
| TKO (submission to punches)
| Strikeforce: Houston
| 
| align=center | 1
| align=center | 1:02
| Houston, Texas, United States
|
|-
| Win
| align=center | 4–0
|style="text-align:left;"|Tony Johnson
| Submission (rear-naked choke)
| KOTC: Imminent Danger
| 
| align=center | 1
| align=center | 2:27
| Mescalero, New Mexico, United States
| 
|-
|-
| Win
| align=center | 3–0
|style="text-align:left;"| Lucas Browne
| TKO (punches)
| XMMA 2
| 
| align=center | 1
| align=center | 4:35
| Sydney, Australia
| 
|-
| Win
| align=center | 2–0
|style="text-align:left;"| John Devine
| KO (punch)
| Strikeforce Challengers: Johnson vs. Mahe
| 
| align=center | 1
| align=center | 1:19
| Fresno, California, United States
|
|-
| Win
| align=center | 1–0
|style="text-align:left;"|Gary Frazier
| TKO (punches)
| Strikeforce Challengers: Kennedy vs. Cummings
| 
| align=center | 2
| align=center | 3:39
| Bixby, Oklahoma, United States
| 
|-

Freestyle record

|-
! colspan="7"| Senior Freestyle Results
|-
!  Res.
!  Record
!  Opponent
!  Score
!  Date
!  Event
!  Location
|-
|Win
|40–6
|align=left| Chris Pendleton
|style="font-size:88%"|12–5
|style="font-size:88%"|July 5, 2014
|style="font-size:88%"|UFC Fan Expo
|style="text-align:left;font-size:88%;" |
 Las Vegas, Nevada
|-
! style=background:white colspan=7 |
|-
|Win
|39–6
|align=left| Damion Hahn
|style="font-size:88%"|1–0, 1–0
|style="font-size:88%" rowspan=2|June 15, 2008
|style="font-size:88%" rowspan=2|2008 US Olympic Team Trials
|style="text-align:left;font-size:88%;" rowspan=2|
 Las Vegas, Nevada
|-
|Win
|38–6
|align=left| Damion Hahn
|style="font-size:88%"|6–1, 6–0
|-
! style=background:white colspan=7 |
|-
|Win
|37–6
|align=left| Nik Fekete
|style="font-size:88%"|7–0, 2–0
|style="font-size:88%" rowspan=4|April 26, 2008
|style="font-size:88%" rowspan=4|2008 US Senior National Wrestling Championships
|style="text-align:left;font-size:88%;" rowspan=4| Las Vegas, Nevada
|-
|Win
|36–6
|align=left| Max Askren
|style="font-size:88%"|5–0, 7–0
|-
|Win
|35–6
|align=left| Willie Parks
|style="font-size:88%"|1–0, 1–0
|-
|Win
|34–6
|align=left| Nick Preston
|style="font-size:88%"|5–0, 1–0
|-
! style=background:white colspan=7 |
|-
|Win
|33–6
|align=left| Les Sigman
|style="font-size:88%"|6–0, 2–0
|style="font-size:88%" rowspan=3|March 30, 2008
|style="font-size:88%" rowspan=3|2008 Northwest Senior Freestyle Championships
|style="text-align:left;font-size:88%;" rowspan=3| Washington, United States
|-
|Win
|32–6
|align=left|  K.C. Walsh
|style="font-size:88%"|7–0, 1–0
|-
|Win
|31–6
|align=left| Clayton Jack
|style="font-size:88%"|Fall
|-
! style=background:white colspan=7 |
|-
|Win
|30–6
|align=left| Aleksey Krupnyakov
|style="font-size:88%"|1–0, 0–1, 1–0
|style="font-size:88%" rowspan=5|September 19, 2007
|style="font-size:88%" rowspan=5|2007 World Wrestling Championships
|style="text-align:left;font-size:88%;" rowspan=5| Baku, Azerbaijan
|-
|Win
|29–6
|align=left| Kiyotaka Kodaira
|style="font-size:88%"|3–0, 6–0
|-
|Loss
|28–6
|align=left| Saeid Ebrahimi
|style="font-size:88%"|0–5, 1–2
|-
|Win
|28–5
|align=left| Ruslan Sheikhau
|style="font-size:88%"|0–1, 1–0, 3–0
|-
|Win
|27-5
|align=left| Ian Wardell
|style="font-size:88%"|Tech. Fall
|-
! style=background:white colspan=7 |
|-
|Win
|26–5
|align=left| Muhammed Lawal
|style="font-size:88%"|1–0, 1–0
|style="font-size:88%" rowspan=2|June 11, 2007
|style="font-size:88%" rowspan=2|2007 US World Team Trials
|style="text-align:left;font-size:88%;" rowspan=2|
 Las Vegas, Nevada
|-
|Win
|25–5
|align=left| Muhammed Lawal
|style="font-size:88%"|2–1, 1–0
|-
! style=background:white colspan=7 |
|-
|Win
|24–5
|align=left| Muhammed Lawal
|style="font-size:88%"|1–0, 1–0
|style="font-size:88%" rowspan=3|April 7, 2007
|style="font-size:88%" rowspan=3|2007 US Senior National Wrestling Championships
|style="text-align:left;font-size:88%;" rowspan=3| Las Vegas, Nevada
|-
|Win
|23–5
|align=left| Kyle Cerminara
|style="font-size:88%"|4–0, 5–0
|-
|Win
|22–5
|align=left| Israel Silva
|style="font-size:88%"|Fall
|-
! style=background:white colspan=7 |
|-
|Win
|21–5
|align=left| Steve Mocco
|style="font-size:88%"|0–1, 4–3, 1–0
|style="font-size:88%" rowspan=4|February 10, 2007
|style="font-size:88%" rowspan=4|2007 Dave Schultz Memorial International
|style="text-align:left;font-size:88%;" rowspan=4| Colorado Springs, Colorado
|-
|Win
|20–5
|align=left| Tommy Rowlands
|style="font-size:88%"|2–0, 2–0
|-
|Win
|19–5
|align=left| Pat Cummins
|style="font-size:88%"|3–0, 4–0
|-
|Win
|18–5
|align=left| Arakida Nobuyoshi
|style="font-size:88%"|Fall
|-
! style=background:white colspan=7 |
|-
|Loss
|17–5
|align=left| Alireza Heidari
|style="font-size:88%"|0–2, 1–0, 0–7
|style="font-size:88%" rowspan=1|September 27, 2006
|style="font-size:88%" rowspan=1|2006 World Wrestling Championships
|style="text-align:left;font-size:88%;" rowspan=1| Guangzhou, China
|-
! style=background:white colspan=7 |
|-
|Win
|17–4
|align=left| Damion Hahn
|style="font-size:88%"|4–0, 4–0
|style="font-size:88%" rowspan=2|May 28, 2006
|style="font-size:88%" rowspan=2|2006 US World Team Trials
|style="text-align:left;font-size:88%;" rowspan=2|
 Iowa, United States
|-
|Win
|16–4
|align=left| Damion Hahn
|style="font-size:88%"|4–0, 4–0
|-
! style=background:white colspan=7 |
|-
|Win
|15–4
|align=left| Nik Fekete
|style="font-size:88%"|3–0, 5–0
|style="font-size:88%" rowspan=4|April 15, 2006
|style="font-size:88%" rowspan=4|2006 US Senior National Wrestling Championships
|style="text-align:left;font-size:88%;" rowspan=4| Las Vegas, Nevada
|-
|Win
|14–4
|align=left| Damion Hahn
|style="font-size:88%"|3–0, 2–0
|-
|Win
|13–4
|align=left| Kyle Cerminara
|style="font-size:88%"|Fall
|-
|Win
|12–4
|align=left| Raphael Davis
|style="font-size:88%"|6–0, 2–0
|-
! style=background:white colspan=7 |
|-
|Loss
|11–4
|align=left| Aleksey Krupnyakov
|style="font-size:88%"|1–2, 1–8
|style="font-size:88%" rowspan=2|September 26, 2005
|style="font-size:88%" rowspan=2|2005 World Wrestling Championships
|style="text-align:left;font-size:88%;" rowspan=2| Budapest, Hungary
|-
|Win
|11–3
|align=left| Peter Pecha
|style="font-size:88%"|4–0, 3–0
|-
! style=background:white colspan=7 |
|-
|Win
|10–3
|align=left| Tommy Rowlands
|style="font-size:88%"|1–0, 2–0
|style="font-size:88%" rowspan=3|???, 2005
|style="font-size:88%" rowspan=3|2005 US Senior National Wrestling Championships
|style="text-align:left;font-size:88%;" rowspan=3| Las Vegas, Nevada
|-
|Win
|9–3
|align=left| Nick Preston
|style="font-size:88%"|0–1, 3–0, 6–1
|-
|Win
|8–3
|align=left| Andrew Adams
|style="font-size:88%"|7–1, 7–1
|-
! style=background:white colspan=7 |
|-
|Loss
|7–3
|align=left| Alireza Heidari
|style="font-size:88%"|2–3
|style="font-size:88%" rowspan=4|August 26, 2004
|style="font-size:88%" rowspan=4|2004 Summer Olympics
|style="text-align:left;font-size:88%;" rowspan=4| Athens, Greece
|-
|Loss
|7–2
|align=left| Khadzhimurat Gatsalov
|style="font-size:88%"|0–5
|-
|Win
|7–1
|align=left| Bartlomiej Bartnicki
|style="font-size:88%"|10–1
|-
|Win
|6–1
|align=left| Radovan Valach
|style="font-size:88%"|9–0
|-
! style=background:white colspan=7 |
|-
|Win
|5–1
|align=left| Tim Hartung
|style="font-size:88%"|7–0
|style="font-size:88%" rowspan=2|May 21, 2004
|style="font-size:88%" rowspan=2|2004 US Olympic Team Trials
|style="text-align:left;font-size:88%;" rowspan=2|
 Indianapolis, Indiana
|-
|Win
|4–1
|align=left| Tim Hartung
|style="font-size:88%"|Fall
|-
! style=background:white colspan=7 |
|-
|Loss
|3–1
|align=left| Alireza Heidari
|style="font-size:88%"|3–6
|style="font-size:88%" rowspan=4|September 12, 2003
|style="font-size:88%" rowspan=4|2003 World Championships
|style="text-align:left;font-size:88%;" rowspan=4| Manhattan, New York
|-
|Win
|3–0
|align=left| Antoine Jaoude
|style="font-size:88%"|Fall
|-
|Win
|2–0
|align=left| Ricardas Pauliukonis
|style="font-size:88%"|Tech Fall
|-
|Win
|1–0
|align=left| Hakan Koc
|style="font-size:88%"|9–3
|-

NCAA record

! colspan="8"| NCAA Championships Matches
|-
!  Res.
!  Record
!  Opponent
!  Score
!  Date
!  Event
|-
! style=background:white colspan=6 |2001 NCAA Championships  at 184 lbs
|-
|Loss
|6–3
|align=left|Cael Sanderson
|style="font-size:88%"|4–8
|style="font-size:88%" rowspan=5|March 15–17, 2001
|style="font-size:88%" rowspan=5|2001 NCAA Division I Wrestling Championships
|-
|Win
|6–2
|align=left|Andy Hrovat
|style="font-size:88%"|TB 3–1
|-
|Win
|5–2
|align=left|Josh Lambrecht
|style="font-size:88%"|MD 16–4
|-
|Win
|4–2
|align=left|Jake Stork
|style="font-size:88%"|TF 22–7
|-
|Win
|3–2
|align=left|R.D Pursell
|style="font-size:88%"|Fall
|-
! style=background:white colspan=6 |2000 NCAA Championships at 184 lbs
|-
|Loss
|1–2
|align=left|Cash Edwards
|style="font-size:88%"|10–15
|style="font-size:88%" rowspan=5|March 16–18, 2000
|style="font-size:88%" rowspan=5|2000 NCAA Division I Wrestling Championships
|-
|Loss
|1–1
|align=left|Doug Lee
|style="font-size:88%"|4–6
|-
|Win
|1–0
|align=left|Zach Breitenbach
|style="font-size:88%"|16–9
|-

Pay-per-view bouts

See also
 List of current UFC fighters
 List of Strikeforce alumni
 List of male mixed martial artists
 List of UFC champions
 List of UFC bonus award recipients
 Ultimate Fighting Championship Pound for Pound rankings

References

External links

 Official website of Olympian Daniel Cormier (2004)
 
 
 Daniel Cormier profile at the National Wrestling Hall of Fame
 
 

|-

Vacated title 174 days after winning the heavyweight title.

1979 births
African-American mixed martial artists
American male mixed martial artists
American male sport wrestlers
American practitioners of Brazilian jiu-jitsu
Light heavyweight mixed martial artists
Heavyweight mixed martial artists
Living people
Mixed martial artists from Louisiana
Mixed martial artists utilizing collegiate wrestling
Mixed martial artists utilizing freestyle wrestling
Mixed martial artists utilizing Brazilian jiu-jitsu
Oklahoma State University alumni
Olympic wrestlers of the United States
Sportspeople from Lafayette, Louisiana
Wrestlers at the 2004 Summer Olympics
Wrestlers at the 2007 Pan American Games
Wrestlers at the 2008 Summer Olympics
Ultimate Fighting Championship champions
World Wrestling Championships medalists
Pan American Games gold medalists for the United States
Pan American Games bronze medalists for the United States
Pan American Games medalists in wrestling
Ultimate Fighting Championship male fighters
Medalists at the 2007 Pan American Games
20th-century African-American sportspeople